Ginette Marguerite Auger (17 April 1920 14 March 2004) was an American comedian, actress, and singer, best remembered for her regular appearances on Tonight Starring Jack Paar and The Jack Paar Show in the 1950s/60s.

Born and raised in Paris, France, Genevieve was discovered by an American talent agent in 1954, and brought to New York as a cabaret and supper club singer. She got her break in 1957, where her mangled use of the English language pivoted her into a more comic persona. She married writer, director, and producer Ted Mills in 1960; and following the end of Paar's program in 1965, her career receded.

Her final credited appearances were in the TV miniseries Scruples, released in 1980. She died at age 83 in 2004, in Los Angeles, California from complications following a stroke.

Her stepdaughter (Ted Mills' daughter), Alley Mills, starred in the TV series Wonder Years and was married to Orson Bean.

References
 
Genevieve as Mystery Guest on "What's My Line?" (Mar 5, 1961)
 Obituary

1920 births
2004 deaths
Actresses from Paris
American television actresses
20th-century American actresses
French emigrants to the United States
21st-century American women